Naemyeongbu (Hangul: 내명부, Hanja: 內命婦), literally Women of the Internal Court, was a category of rank in the royal court of the Joseon dynasty that referred to concubines and female officials living within the palaces. It was separate from the Oemyeongbu category, which consisted of royal women living outside the palace.

Definition 
Although regulations concerning court ladies were introduced under King Taejo, detailed definitions of ranks, titles, and duties were outlined in the State Code of Joseon, promulgated under King Seongjong, where the term naemyeongbu appears.

Naemyeongbu comprised women serving at court and living in the palaces, but excluded the Queen, who was beyond rank and oversaw the court ladies. By contrast, gungnyeo refers to all women at court below the senior 1st rank.

Within the naemyeongbu, the naegwan were concubines from the senior 1st rank to junior 4th rank, and they did not play any role in the household chores of the palace.

Ladies from the senior 5th rank to junior 9th rank were called gunggwan, or alternatively yeogwan and nain. They were responsible for various palace chores depending on their position and might work in the royal chambers, kitchen, or laundry.

Recruitment

Naegwan

Queens and Crown Princesses 

The legal spouse of a King or Crown Prince during the Joseon dynasty was selected through a specific procedure that differed from matchmaking practices common outside the royal family. The government issued a ban on marriages in noble households throughout the country, indicating that unmarried daughters of the aristocracy between the ages of 13 and 17 were potential candidates. Depending on the age of the crown prince, girls as young as 9 were sometimes considered, which occurred in the selections of Lady Hyegyeong and Queen Sinjeong. A temporary department called the Office of the Royal Wedding was installed to manage all relevant tasks.

On announcement of the marriage ban, aristocratic families were required to submit details of their unmarried daughters' birth dates and times, as well as the family's genealogical records up to three generations. Candidates were required to be beautiful in appearance and virtuous in character. Those who were not considered physically attractive were disqualified, regardless of their family lineage or virtue. Five to six candidates were selected based on this, which was whittled down to two or three candidates in the second stage, with the bride-to-be selected in the third round. This third presentation was conducted in the presence of the King and Queen Dowager, who consulted the three state councillors before making the final decision.

After selection, gifts of silk and jewellery were sent to the bride's family, and the bride moved to a detached palace where she was instructed in palace etiquette. The wife of a King was then formally invested as Queen, after which she moved into the palace to undergo a consummation ceremony. The next day, she was greeted by all palace staff, after which she went to greet the Queen Dowager(s). An invested Queen of Joseon would then receive formal recognition from the Emperor of China acknowledging her legitimacy.

Despite the benefits of one's daughter being selected as the primary wife of the King or Crown Prince, aristocratic families were often reticent to marry their daughters into the royal family and quickly arranged marriages for their young daughters when a selection was anticipated. One lady of the Gwon clan even feigned insanity during the presentation to avoid being chosen as Crown Princess.

Royal concubines 
If the Queen Consort did not produce a male heir, similar formal procedures as those used to select the Queen were followed to recruit royal concubines. Women thus selected entered the palace with the junior 2nd rank at the minimum, and they would be granted a special title if they had a son who became Crown Prince. Royal concubines were sometimes selected from women up to the age of 20.

Gunggwan

Court ladies of the senior 5th to junior 9th ranks were recruited through various processes depending on the role. They were originally selected from among female servants who worked for public offices or the daughters of gisaeng, but gradually daughters of respectable families came to be recruited. To avoid their daughters being taken into the palace, many such families married off their daughters very young, leading to a revision to the State Code that girls born to good families would not be recruited. However, Lee Bae-yong suggests that this rule probably only applied to court ladies of the lower ranks, whereas those working closely with the King or Queen potentially continued to be recruited from good families.

Girls were recruited between ages 4 to 10, and successful candidates were bound to live their entire lives in the palace. The young girls were trained in their duties and taught to write in Korean vernacular script, as well as some Chinese characters. They began formally working around ages 11 to 12, with a coming-of-age ceremony held when they turned 18.

A woman only became eligible to hold the rank of sanggung (senior 5th) after 35 years of service. Both the head sanggung as well as the sanggung who personally attended the King or Queen could hold tremendous influence and power, but they typically lost it if a new monarch or consort was installed.

Ranks 
The Queen Consort (jungjeon; 중전) was followed by 4 categories of high-ranked royal consorts, with 2 levels each: senior (jeong, 정) and junior (jong, 종).

For the rank of Bin, the King or Queen would attach a prefix in association with the character/personality of the Royal Consort, such as Huibin (Hui = Radiant), Sukbin (Suk = Clarity/Purity), Uibin (Ui = Appropriate/Fitting), and so forth. However, they are all equal as they hold the same "Bin" rank.

Senior 5th sanggung (상궁; 尙宮) and sangui (상의; 尙儀) were the court ladies who served directly under the royal family members, or the head manager of their assigned department. Depending on their role and department, there would be internal ranking within the sanggung. For example, a sanggung who served the Queen has higher authority and ranking than a sanggung who serves a prince, princess, and/or concubine.

A court lady could also become a sanggung if the King showed favor. They would be called "favored sanggung" or "special court lady" ("seungeun sanggung") and would be considered the highest rank of the senior 5th. However, since they are still in the 5th rank, a favored sanggung would not be considered a member of the Royal Family or part of the naegwan. On some occasions a favored sanggung was promoted to the rank of Sugwon.

Officially admitted royal consorts would start from the rank of Sugui. Non-officially admitted royal consorts would start from the rank of Sugwon. The most notable case is Royal Noble Consort Hui of the Indong Jang clan.

Notable Naemyeongbu

Queens
The Cheongju Han clan produced 16 Queens, the largest number in Korean history. Queen Sohye, wife of Crown Prince Uigyeong, and a member of the clan, wrote Naehun, a Confucian morality guidebook for women.
Queen Wongyeong of the Yeoheung Min clan (1365–1420)
 Queen Jeheon of the Haman Yun clan (1445–1482)
 Queen Sohye of the Cheongju Han clan (1437–1504)
 Queen Jeonghui of the Papyeong Yun clan (1418–1483)
 Queen Munjeong of the Papyeong Yun clan (1501–1565)
 Queen Inhyeon of the Yeoheung Min clan (1667–1701)
 Queen Inwon of the Gyeongju Kim clan (1687–1757)
 Queen Jeongseong of the Dalsung Seo clan (1692–1757)
 Queen Jeongsun of the Gyeongju Kim clan (1745–1805)
 Queen Sunwon of the Andong Kim clan (1789–1857)
 Queen Cheorin of the Andong Kim clan (1837–1878)
 Empress Myeongseong of the Yeoheung Min clan (1851–1895)
 Empress Sunjeong of the Haepyeong Yun clan (1894–1966)

Crown Princesses
 Crown Princess Hwi of the Old Andong Kim Clan (1410–1429) – deposed for witchcraft
 Crown Princess Sun of the Haeum Bong Clan (1414–?) – deposed for relations with her maid
 Lady Hyegyeong of the Pungsan Hong clan (1735–1816) – author of the Memoirs of Lady Hyegyeong and wife of the executed Crown Prince Sado

Notable Consorts
 Royal Noble Consort Hui of the Indong Jang clan (1659–1701), a key figure in the factional struggles during King Sukjong's reign, executed by poisoning for plotting the murder of Queen Inhyeon
 Royal Noble Consort Suk of the Haeju Choe clan (1670–1718), supporter of Queen Inhyeon during her deposition, mother of King Yeongjo 
 Royal Noble Consort Yeong of the Jeonui Yi clan (1696–1764), mother of the executed Crown Prince Sado
 Royal Noble Consort Ui of the Changnyeong Seong clan (1753–1786), the only woman that King Jeongjo loved amongst his wives

See also
 Mingfu
 Myōbu
 Concubine
 Polygamy
 Styles and titles in the Joseon dynasty 
 Women in the Joseon Dynasty
 Gungnyeo
 Naehun

Notes

References 

 
 
 

Royal consorts of the Joseon dynasty
Joseon dynasty
Korean ladies-in-waiting
Korean royal consorts
Royal titles
Women by social class
Gendered occupations
Obsolete occupations